Self Destruction is the first studio album by American hip hop artist I Self Devine. It was released August 2, 2005 on Rhymesayers Entertainment. It was named one of the most underrated Rhymesayers Entertainment releases by Star Tribune in 2013.

Music 
The album is produced by Ant of Atmosphere, Vitamin D, Jake One, and Bean One. Guest appearances include Budah Tye, Matza I and Blacc Money.

Track listing

References

External links 
 Self Destruction at Bandcamp
 Self Destruction at Discogs

2005 albums
Albums produced by Ant (producer)
Albums produced by Jake One
Hip hop albums by American artists
Rhymesayers Entertainment albums